Arthur Benton may refer to:

 Arthur Lester Benton (1909–2006), American neuropsychologist
 Arthur Burnett Benton (1858–1927), American architect